Two at a Time: Sneak Peeks & B-Sides is the fourth intermediate album release from Christian rock band Downhere. Disc 1 contains two new 2010 singles and Disc 2 contains B-Side material.

Track listing

Disc 1
"You're Not Alone" - 3:40
"The Song You Sing" - 4:10

Disc 2
"One Small Step" - 3:47
"Everything to Lose" - 4:14
"Break My Heart" - 4:01
"Everything Will" - 3:30
"Excavate" - 3:48
"Household Name" - 4:21
"Grown Man" - 5:05
"Stand With Me" - 4:50
"Back to the Chorus" - 3:49)

Singles
"You're Not Alone" (May 14, 2010)

References

Downhere albums
2010 compilation albums